Falougha - Khalwat Falougha is a municipality in the Baabda District of Mount Lebanon Governorate, Lebanon. The municipality consists of the villages of Falougha and Khalwat Falougha. It is 35 kilometers east of Beirut. Falougha - Khalwat Falougha has an average elevation of 1,250 meters above sea level and a total land area of 1,563 hectares. In 2016, Falougha had 3,400 registered voters while Khalwat Falougha had 600.

There is a public school in the village with 150 students as of 2016 and a local hospital with thirty beds. There are seven companies that each employ over five employees operating in Falougha. Falougha has a mixed population of Druze and Christians from the Maronite, Melkite (Greek Catholic) and Greek Orthodox denominations, while Khalouat Falougha's inhabitants are entirely Druze.

References

Druze communities in Lebanon
Eastern Orthodox Christian communities in Lebanon
Maronite Christian communities in Lebanon
Melkite Christian communities in Lebanon
Populated places in Baabda District